Michael Wardrop (born 23 December 1955) is an English former footballer who played as a midfielder for Manchester United and New York Cosmos.

Career statistics

Club

Notes

References

Living people
1955 births
English footballers
English expatriate footballers
Association football midfielders
Manchester United F.C. players
New York Cosmos players
Kettering Town F.C. players
North American Soccer League (1968–1984) players
Expatriate soccer players in the United States
English expatriate sportspeople in the United States